Andrew Dane Larkin (born June 27, 1974) is an American former Major League Baseball pitcher who played for the Florida Marlins, Cincinnati Reds, and the Kansas City Royals. He was drafted by the Florida Marlins in the 25th round of the 1992 amateur draft. He made his debut on September 29, 1996, against the Houston Astros and gave up three hits and one earned run in 5 innings. He picked up his one and only MLB save on August 9, 2000 by retiring the last batter of the game to preserve a 5–3 Royals victory over the Blue Jays.  

He is currently a firefighter in Gilbert, Arizona.

References

External links

1974 births
Living people
People from Chelan, Washington
People from Gilbert, Arizona
Sportspeople from the Phoenix metropolitan area
Baseball players from Washington (state)
Major League Baseball pitchers
Cincinnati Reds players
Florida Marlins players
Kansas City Royals players
American firefighters